The Ven. Edwin Berry Bartleet, D.D. (1872 - 1946) was an Anglican priest: he was Archdeacon of Ludlow from 1928 to 1932.

Dixon was educated at Clifton College and New College, Oxford. He began his career with a curacy at Doncaster Parish Church. During World War I was a Chaplain to the Forces. He held incumbencies in Hope, Derbyshire, Much Wenlock and Wistanstow.

He died on 17 December 1946.

Notes

1872 births
People educated at Clifton College
Alumni of New College, Oxford
Archdeacons of Ludlow
1936 deaths